Baitul Islam (House of Islam) is a mosque in Vaughan, Ontario run by the Ahmadiyya Muslim Community (AMJ) in Canada.
It was inaugurated on October, 17th 1992 in the presence of the fourth Caliph of the community and many Members of Parliament.

Peace Village

Peace Village, also known as Ahmadiyya Village, is a monumental housing project of 260 homes built on a  parcel of land near Baitul Islam Mosque in the neighbourhood of Maple in Vaughan, Ontario. All nine streets within the neighbourhood are named after the Caliphs of the community and other prominent Ahmadi scholars. The main street is called Ahmadiyya Avenue, and the community park is named "Ahmadiyya Park". The mosque is visible from all the streets.

The village was planned by Naseer Ahmad, and construction started on April 5, 1999. In March 2009, there were plans to expand the mosque and build a high school in the surrounding empty fields.

Jamia Ahmadiyya
Baitul Hamd, nearby in Mississauga, served as the Jamia Ahmadiyya (Missionary Training College) for Canada and North America until 2010. Jamia Ahmadiyya is now located in Tahir Hall, the local community centre of Peace Village.

See also 
 Baitul Islam
 List of mosques in America
List of mosques in Canada
 List of mosques in the Americas
 Lists of mosques

References

External links 
 Ahmadiyya Muslim Jamaat Canada
 Peace Village
 Housing project planned around mosque, Calgary Herald, October 11, 2007
 Building an Enclave Around a Mosque in Suburban Toronto, New York Times, November 18, 2007

Ahmadiyya mosques in Canada
Mosques in Ontario
Buildings and structures in Vaughan
Mosques completed in 1992
1992 establishments in Ontario
Mosques in Toronto
20th-century religious buildings and structures in Canada